Haggard is a surname.

List of people with surname Haggard
 Barton J. Haggard, American college football coach (Hiram Terriers football)
 Chris Haggard (born 1971), South African professional tennis player
 Cornelius Paul Haggard, American theologian, president of Azusa Pacific University and founder of Evangel Church
 Daisy Haggard (born 1978), British actress
 Gayle Haggard (born 1957), American evangelical author and speaker
 Godfrey Haggard (1884–1969), British diplomat
 H. Rider Haggard, Sir (1856–1925), British Victorian writer of adventure novels
 Hugh Haggard (1908–1991), British submarine commander during World War II
 John Haggard (1794–1856), British ecclesiastical lawyer 
 Kenneth Haggard (born 1935), American architect, educator and solar pioneer
 Leroy Haggard (born 1968), birth name of Mr. Lee (rapper), American DJ, producer and rapper
 Lilias Rider Haggard (1892–1968), British writer
 Mark Haggard (1825–1854), British clergyman and rower
 Marty Haggard (born 1958), American country music singer and songwriter
 Merle Haggard (1937–2016), American country music singer and songwriter
 Noel Haggard (born 1963), American country music singer and songwriter
 Patrick Haggard, cognitive neuroscientist
 Paul Haggard, pen name of Stephen Longstreet (1907–2002), American writer 
 Piers Haggard (born 1939), British film and television director
 Stephan Haggard, American academic, author and scholar of Korean studies
 Stephen Haggard (1911–1943), British actor, writer and poet
 Ted Haggard (born 1956), American evangelical pastor and founder of New Life Church - Colorado Springs, Colorado
 Vernon Haggard (1874–1960), British Royal Navy admiral
 William Haggard (1907–1993), British writer of fictional spy thrillers
 William S. Haggard (1847–1911), American politician, Lieutenant Governor of Indiana

See also
 Haggard family

Surnames
Haggard family